CAR Cáceres is a Spanish rugby team based in Cáceres.

Season to season

1 season in División de Honor B

External links
Official website

Spanish rugby union teams
Rugby clubs established in 1981
Sport in Cáceres, Spain
Sports teams in Extremadura